The Center for Study of Science, Technology and Policy (CSTEP) is an Indian think tank based in Bengaluru.

Its research is consolidated into five sectors: Climate, Environment and Sustainability; Energy and Power; AI and Digital Platforms; Strategic Studies; and Computational Tools.

History 
CSTEP was founded in 2005 by Dr V. S. R. Arunachalam, former Scientific Advisor to India's Defence Minister (1982-1992) and former head of DRDO, along with Professor P Rama Rao. Dr Anshu Bharadwaj, a former IAS officer, was the first Executive Director from 2009-2020 before being succeeded by Dr Jai Asundi.

In 2008, CSTEP received its first grant from Shri Sivasubramaniya Nadar Educational and Charitable Trust to conduct studies in energy. In 2018 the organization set up the Centre for Air Pollution Studies (CAPS) and launched the Artificial Intelligence & Digital Labs.

Staff 
In 2022, CSTEP employed 126 people in fields such as science and engineering, policy, economics, IT, management, and communication. As of 2022 its chairman is its founder Dr. Arunachalam and its Executive Director is Dr. Jai Asundi (2020 onwards).

Location 
CSTEP was founded in Arunachalam's residence in Bengaluru and later worked out of the CAIR (DRDO) office on Infantry Road, Bengaluru. As of 2022, CSTEP operates out of two locations, with one office in Bengaluru and another in Noida.

Activities

India Clean Air Summit 
The India Clean Air Summit (ICAS) is CSTEP's flagship event on Air Pollution, organised by the Centre for Air Pollution Studies (CAPS).

Role of Science & Technology for Society 
In March 2020, CSTEP initiated a Discussion Series on the Role of Science & Technology for Society, with the stated aim of making "science accessible to citizens to find sustainable solutions for India's developmental challenges".

The first event of the series was woven around the launch of Dr Arunachalam's book ‘From Temples to Turbines: An Adventure in Two Worlds’. The Chief Designer of LCA Tejas, Kota Harinarayana, and former Chief Secretary to the Government of Karnataka SV Ranganath, were the main speakers at the event.

India Energy Transformation Platform 
CSTEP is the Secretariat for the India Energy Transformation Platform, a program created in 2018 to strategize on India's long-term energy future.

Funding 
CSTEP is registered under Section 25 of the Companies Act, 1956 and receives grants from national and international foundations, industry trusts, and governments.

It has received grants from foundations such as the International Development Research Centre (IDRC), OAK Foundation, Rohini & Nandan Nilekani Philanthropies, World Bank, United Nations Development Programme, the Bill and Melinda Gates Foundation, and many others.

Policy influence 
It has been involved in a number of policy projects in collaboration with the Indian government as well as national and international organizations such as the Gates Foundation, IBM, Bureau of Energy Efficiency, and the Planning Commission.

Collaborative projects 
CSTEP has also collaborated with other organizations on various projects. It was one of the Indian organizations which participated in SERIIUS, a joint clean energy development program established by the Government of India and the US Department of Energy, as well as multiple projects with the European Union.

References 

Think tanks based in India
Think tanks established in 2005
2005 establishments in India